This is a list of recordings of the opera Faust (1859) by Charles Gounod, sung in French unless otherwise noted.

Recordings

References
Notes

Sources
Amazon Faust discography (15 items)

Opera discographies
Faust Discography